January 30 - Eastern Orthodox liturgical calendar - February 1

All fixed commemorations below are observed on February 13 by Eastern Orthodox Churches on the Old Calendar.

For January 31st, Orthodox Churches on the Old Calendar commemorate the Saints listed on January 18.

Saints
 Martyr Tryphaena of Cyzicus (1st century)
 Martyrs Victorinus, Victor, Nicephorus, Claudius, Diodorus, Serapion, and Papias, at Corinth (251 or 258)
 Holy Wonderworkers and Unmercenaries Cyrus and John, and Martyrs Athanasia and her daughters Theoctista, Theodota, and Eudoxia, at Canopus in Egypt (311)
 Martyrs Saturninus, Thyrsus and Victor, at Alexandria.
 Martyrs Tharsicius, Zoticus, Cyriacus, and their companions, at Alexandaria.
 Saint Julius of Aegina (Julius of Novara), missionary priest to northern Italy (401)
 Saint Athanasius, Bishop of Methone (ca. 880)

Pre-Schism Western saints
 Saint Geminian of Modena, Deacon and later successor of the Bishop of Modena (348)
 Saint Marcella of Rome (410)
 Saint Madoes (Madianus), a saint who has left his name to a place in the Carse of Gowrie in Scotland.
 Saint Áedan (Maedoc), first Bishop of Ferns in Co. Wexford in Ireland, where he also founded and became abbot of a monastery (626)
 Saint Adamnan (Adomnán), born in Ireland, he became a monk at Coldingham Priory, now in Scotland (681)
 Saint Wilgils, father of St Willibrord, born in Northumbria in England, he settled on the banks of the River Humber and lived as a hermit (ca. 700)
 Saint Bobinus, monk at Moutier-la-Celle. Later he became Bishop of Troyes (ca. 766)
 Saint Ulphia (Wulfia, Olfe, Wulfe), hermitess near Amiens in France (8th century)
 Saint Eusebius, monk at St Gall in Switzerland and later lived as a hermit on Mt St Victor in the Vorarlberg (884)
 Saint John Angelus, born in Venice in Italy, he became a monk at Pomposa (ca. 1050)

Post-Schism Orthodox saints
 Venerable Nikita, recluse of the Kiev Caves, Bishop of Novgorod (1108)
 Venerable Pachomius, abbot of Keno Lake Monastery (1525)  (see also May 15)
 New Monk-martyr Elias (Ardunis) of Mt. Athos and Kalamata (1686)
 Saint Arsenius the New, of Paros (1877)

Other commemorations
 Synaxis of the Icon of the Most Holy Theotokos Koroniotissa or Dakryrroousis, at Lixouri, Cephalonia (1867)
 Repose of Eugene Poselyanin (Pogozhev), spiritual writer (1931)
 Repose of Elder Codratus (Condratus) of Karakalou monastery, Mt. Athos (1940)
 Repose of Hieroschemamonk Stephen (Ignatenko) of Kislovodsk (1973)

 Martyrdom of Paul (de Ballester-Convallier), Bishop of Nazianzus, in Mexico City (1984)

Icon gallery

Notes

References

Sources
 January 31 / February 13. Orthodox Calendar (PRAVOSLAVIE.RU).
 February 13 / January 31. HOLY TRINITY RUSSIAN ORTHODOX CHURCH (A parish of the Patriarchate of Moscow).
 January 31. OCA - The Lives of the Saints.
 The Autonomous Orthodox Metropolia of Western Europe and the Americas (ROCOR). St. Hilarion Calendar of Saints for the year of our Lord 2004. St. Hilarion Press (Austin, TX). p. 11.
 January 31. Latin Saints of the Orthodox Patriarchate of Rome.
 The Roman Martyrology. Transl. by the Archbishop of Baltimore. Last Edition, According to the Copy Printed at Rome in 1914. Revised Edition, with the Imprimatur of His Eminence Cardinal Gibbons. Baltimore: John Murphy Company, 1916. pp. 32–33.
 Rev. Richard Stanton. A Menology of England and Wales, or, Brief Memorials of the Ancient British and English Saints Arranged According to the Calendar, Together with the Martyrs of the 16th and 17th Centuries. London: Burns & Oates, 1892. pp. 42–43.
Greek Sources
 Great Synaxaristes:  31 ΙΑΝΟΥΑΡΙΟΥ. ΜΕΓΑΣ ΣΥΝΑΞΑΡΙΣΤΗΣ.
  Συναξαριστής. 31 Ιανουαρίου. ECCLESIA.GR. (H ΕΚΚΛΗΣΙΑ ΤΗΣ ΕΛΛΑΔΟΣ). 
Russian Sources
  13 февраля (31 января). Православная Энциклопедия под редакцией Патриарха Московского и всея Руси Кирилла (электронная версия). (Orthodox Encyclopedia - Pravenc.ru).
  31 января (ст.ст.) 13 февраля 2013 (нов. ст.). Русская Православная Церковь Отдел внешних церковных связей. (DECR).

January in the Eastern Orthodox calendar